Delias timorensis is a butterfly in the family Pieridae. It was described by Jean Baptiste Boisduval in 1836. It is found in the Australasian realm.

The wingspan is about 60–70 mm for males and 64–71  mm for females.

Subspecies
D. t. timorensis (Timor)
D. t. moaensis Rothschild, 1915 (Leti Island)
D. t. babberica Talbot, 1939 (Babar Island)
D. t. romaensis Rothschild, 1915 (Romang Island)
D. t. ardesiaca Rothschild, 1915 (Damar)
D. t. gardineri Fruhstorfer, 1904 (Tanimbar Group)
D. t. vishnu Moore, 1857 (Wetter Island)

References

External links
Delias at Markku Savela's Lepidoptera and Some Other Life Forms

timorensis
Butterflies described in 1836